Yomawari: Midnight Shadows is a survival horror video game developed and published by Nippon Ichi Software for PlayStation 4, PlayStation Vita and Microsoft Windows via Steam. The game is a sequel to Yomawari: Night Alone, which originally released in 2015 in Japan. It was released in Japan on August 24, 2017 and in western territories in October 2017. It was released in Asia with Traditional Chinese subtitles under Sega.

The game was released in October 2018 for the Nintendo Switch, alongside its predecessor, as part of Yomawari: The Long Night Collection.

Plot
After going to a late summer fireworks festival together in the mountains, the girls Yui and Haru got lost on the way back home. When they let go of each other's hands, they got separated. Mustering up their courage, the two girls explore an ominous night town which is completely different during daytime and where someone is lurking in the shadows. As the story advances, the player will switch between the perspectives of Yui and Haru. The actions, decisions and information you get from playing as one will impact the story of the other.

Gameplay
Players explore a town at night in order to bring the two girls back together and find the way home. The only source of light is a flashlight. While exploring, the player finds items and strange 'spirits', who are lurking in various places such as shades of mountains, street corners, and below a street light, and sometimes attack the player. When a spirit is around, the girl's heartbeat will increase. Since the girls cannot fight, the player has to find ways to overcome the spirits, for example by running away, hiding, or using an item. Since each spirit has its own characteristics, the best method to use differs per spirit. Players can push large objects, such as wooden boxes, in order to create stepping stones, which enables the player to get past blockades. As the story progresses, the player finds charm-like items, called 'Omamori', which have an influence on the stats of the girls, such as making stamina harder to reduce, or increasing the girls' run speed.

Reception 
Yomawari: Midnight Shadows received "generally favorable" reviews according to review aggregator Metacritic.

Sequel
Yomawari: Lost in the Dark was developed and published by Nippon Ichi and released on the Nintendo Switch and PlayStation 4 on April 21, 2022 in Japan. It was  released in North America and Europe on October 25, 2022 in North America and on October 28, 2022 in Europe for the Nintendo Switch and PlayStation 4 alongside a port for Microsoft Windows.

Notes

References

External links
  

Video games developed in Japan
Nintendo Switch games
Nippon Ichi Software games
2017 video games
PlayStation 4 games
PlayStation Vita games
Windows games
Video games featuring female protagonists
2010s horror video games
Stealth video games
Yōkai in popular culture
Video game sequels